Sheldon Karlin (1950 – 16 January 2000) was an American male marathon runner who won the New York City Marathon in 1972.

Biography
His career in the sport was brief and mostly confined to the early 1970s. Karlin placed fourth at the Washington's Birthday Marathon in February 1972, then had the biggest achievement of his running career later that year at the New York City Marathon. He expressed surprise at his win in a time of 2:27:52, having failed to realise he was the race leader for a portion of the race. At age 22, he remained the competition's youngest male winner for many years, eventually being topped by a 20-year-old Eritrean, Ghirmay Ghebreslassie, in 2016. He returned to win the Washington's Birthday Marathon in 1974 in 2:26:27, and also won the Hunter's Woods Elementary School 20-miler that year.

Born in Newark, New Jersey, Karlin grew up in Kenilworth, New Jersey, where at David Brearley High School he ran cross country. Karlin attended the University of Maryland and competed for the Maryland Terrapins cross country running team. He was promised a sports scholarship if he excelled on the team, but when the scholarship was not forthcoming, he left the college team. Following his retirement from the sport, he lived in Livingston, New Jersey, with his wife, Donna. The couple had three children in the 1980s. He died of a heart condition at age 49 following poor health. The Washington Running Club, of which Karlin was a founder member, named its club competition trophy the Sheldon Karlin Cup in his honour.

References

External links
 Sheldon Karlin at Association of Road Racing Statisticians

2000 deaths
People from Kenilworth, New Jersey
People from Livingston, New Jersey
Sportspeople from Union County, New Jersey
Track and field athletes from Newark, New Jersey
American male long-distance runners
American male marathon runners
New York City Marathon male winners
Maryland Terrapins men's cross country runners
1950 births